Satpanth is a Sanskrit term used initially by Nizari Isma'ilis and Ismaili Sufis to identify their faith formed over 700 years ago by Pir Sadardin (1290-1367 CE). Although the term is today used mainly by its subgroup formed in the 15th century by his grandson Pir Imam Shah (1430-1520 CE) which itself consists of various sub-sects, and differs from the mainstream Nizari Khojas in that they reject the Aga Khan as their leader and are known more commonly as Imamshahi. Uniquely, the term Satpanth has been historically used by Ismailis that claim to be Muslim, as well as by adherents of subgroups that claim to be Hindus. There are villages in Gujarat which are totally Satpanthi such as Pirana near Ahmedabad where Imam Shah is buried. Satpanthi dargahs are known to be venerated with a stark contrast in the devotees, with outward Muslims who may wear a hijab, and outward Hindus wearing traditional garb such as the sari.

Satpanth can be described as a synthesis of Hinduism and Isma'ilism as most who refer to themselves as Satpanthi claim they are Hindu and retain their Hindu names and traditions. This has resulted in a unique syncretism in which adherents strongly employ Hindu symbols, especially the Om and swastika, keep Sanskrit names, and observe all mainstream Hindu religious occasions, while prayers can also include the fusion of Persian and Arabic duas.

The term Satpanth is used historically by mainstream Ismailis who outwardly claim to be Muslims, keep Muslim names, and have given up most if not all connections to their Hindu history, including the use of the term Satpanth itself, which is Sanskrit for "True Path". Meanwhile, its related subgroups, including the Imamshahis, may exert the opposite approach, by denying any connections to Ismailism and Sufism, and accentuating their Hindu beliefs and use of Hindu symbolism.

History

Origin
Pir Sadruddin and his grandson Pir Imam Shah are credited with the conversion of the Khojas from the Hindu caste of the Lohanas located in Punjab, Rajasthan, and Gujarat. He laid the foundation of the communal organization, built the first assembly and prayer halls and appointed the community leaders mukhis. The founder of the Imamshahi Satpanth was Pir Sayed Nur or Nar Muhammad Shah who broke with the Nizari Isma'ili dawah in the 16th century by proclaiming himself the da'i or the Pir instead of Pir Tajuddin who was appointed as the Nizari Isma'ili da'i for Hind and Sindh by the Nizari Isma'ili Imam Muhammad bin Islam Shah. He thus lead the Satpanth until his death in 1534 AD.

The descendants of Pir Sayed Nar Muhammad Shah (died 1534) led the Imamshahi Satpanth and its branches. They were Sa'id Khan, Muhammad Shah and Shahji Miran Shah. Shahji Miran Shah's son and successor Sayyid Muhammad Shah along with his followers, especially among the Matiya Kanbis caste, launched a revolt and seized the fort of Bharuch. This revolt occurred around 1688/89 and was put down by Aurangzeb. The leadership of the Imamshahi Satpanth remained in the hands of the direct descendants of Shahji Miran Shah until Baqir Ali who died around 1835 and was the last Pir of the Aththiya. Shahji Miran Shah's wife Raji Tahira founded a separate branch of the Imamshahi Satpanth. The Imamshahi Satpanth then split into various groups that later identified as either Hindu or Muslim in the present day.

Pir Sayyid Imam Shah was a prominent Nizari Ismaili da'i in India. His name was Imamuddin Abdur Rahim. He was born in Uchh Sharif in 834/1430, and was the younger son of Pir Hasan Kabiruddin. The Nizari Isma'ili historical tradition explains that when Pir Hasan Kabiruddin died, all his sons were present at Uch Sharif with the exception of Pir Sayed Imam Shah. The tradition.

The foundational narrative of the Gupti community of Bhavnagar references Pir Sayyid Imam Shah's Satpanth teachings. It discusses the pilgrimage of their Hindu ancestors to the sacred city of Kashi to bathe in the Ganges in search of forgiveness for their sins. On their way to Kashi, they encountered Imam Shah near Ahmedabad, who explained the futility of the journey and that they could bathe in the Ganges at that very place. He explained the mysteries of the Satpanth to pilgrims, who joined the path of their new spiritual guide. Gupti leaders were given an audience (dīdār) with the Ismaili Imam Sir Sultan Muhammad Shah Aga Khan III in 1939. Details of this encounter are recorded in the Khojki book The Jewel of Mercy, which describes how the Imam told the Gupti leaders that Imamshah had correctly shown them recognition of the Imam of the time, in accordance with his own beliefs. The Imam further urged them to perform esoteric worship (bāṭinī ‘ibādat), never pretentiously, and to never cause pain to anyone.

Pir Sayyid Imam Shah married the daughter of Shah Muhammad Shah II Bakhri, the Sultan of the Gujarat Sultanate, who gave birth to Pir Sayed Nur/Nar Muhammad Shah (d. 1534 CE). Pir Sayed Imam Shah died in 1520 CE and was buried in Pirana, Gujarat, the site of his famous Dargah. It is said that he abjured traditional Ismailism and created a community far more syncretic with Hinduism, Buddhism and Jainism. The reason for this schism is often attributed to legends of a quarrel with his kin or a shift in his own philosophy and theology. Weighing up the extant evidence, it appears that he remained ingrained in Nizari Ismailism and demonstrated unswerving loyalty to the Nizari Ismaili Imams, see List of Isma'ili imams for further information, till his death, and never took any other route in his ambition. He remains famous and revered by his followers for encouraging the preservation of traditional (mostly Hindu) culture and customs, in stark contrast to other Islamic and Christian missions. According to "The Shorter Encyclopaedia of Islam"(Leiden, 1961, p. 167), "As far as it is possible to ascertain, he cannot be regarded as the founder of a new sect, as he remained loyal to the Imam of his time." He wrote many ginans which are recited by the Nizari Ismailis. He had four sons, viz. Sayed Alam Shah, Sayed Ali Shah, Sayed Bakar Shah and Sayed Nur Muhammad Shah, and a daughter called Shams Khatoon.

People
The people of the Satpanth consist mostly of high-caste converts of Lohana origin. Others are from Rajput, merchant, and farming castes including those that claim to be from Patidar and Patel communities belonging to Western and Northwestern India. Athiya Patel's are not generally accepted as authentic Patidars, and adopted the surname for social mobility. Some are migrants from neighbouring Indian states—including Madhya Pradesh, the Punjab and Rajasthan—who now reside in Gujarat (mainly the Kutch and commercial areas) and Mumbai. Many community are also of this faith. Followers of Satpanth are also present in significant numbers in Jalgaon, Nandurbar and Dhule districts of Northern Maharashtra. The followers are divided into two essential groups, one group identifies as Hindu and follows the leadership of the Kakas as priests, the other group identifies as Muslim and follows either Sunni Sufi Islam or Twelver Shia Islam with Pir Imam Shah as a common saint between the two groups.

Satpanth is used as a means of self-identification for millions of resident and non-resident Indians, and due to the varying degrees of its syncretic structure, there are various sects who reject a singular leadership and elect local committees. The leadership of the Muslim identifying group of Satpanthis is led by the descendants of Pir Imam Shah known as Saiyeds. Other groups will appoint a single Mukhi or a group of Mukhis to represent their leadership.

Satpanth followers that are more aligned with traditional Ismailism, called Mureeds, believe that the physical form of the Imam is merely a vessel for the spiritual Imam which is Nūr or eternal light. They also believe that his farmans (proclamations), his shabd (word) and his formless being are the real Imam. These separate concepts of an esoteric Imam and an exoteric Imam are called "Baatini Imam" and "Zahiri Imam".

Satpanth devotees believe in "Nurani Didar," which is the "vision of light" or enlightenment one achieves when one views the True Imam. This, again, has an esoteric and an exoteric meaning.

It is customary in each and every Jamaat-khana that a row of community leaders and title holders (male and female) should sit facing the rest of the congregation. There is a row of individuals, sitting with their backs to the side wall, in the male as well as the female section. Both these sections are kept side by side in one large hall. Hence, a row of males would face and prostrate before the females, and vice versa. Looking at individuals of the opposite gender across the hall, and even the passing of objects between genders, is highly discouraged if not forbidden. If an object must be passed such as a utensil, the person must get up and leave it in the middle or end of the hall, where it will eventually picked up by the intended recipient. The reading of Holy Du'a is undertaken while sitting on the floor on one's knees, or while sitting cross-legged as with other sects, with a Misbaha or Mala (rosary) being picked up at intervals. Any individual of any age who is fully versed in the Holy Du'a may lead the prayer.

Since the independence of India in 1947, the Satpanth group that identifies as Hindu Imamshahi has taken control of the main dargah of Pir Sayed Imam Shah and has accentuated Hindu beliefs, deities and rituals to the extent that there is no connection to Ismailism and Sufism at all. The Muslim identifying group accentuates the connection of Pir Sayed Imam Shah to Islam and Sufism through their own beliefs and rituals near the dargah.

Scriptures
The holy writ of the Satpanth tradition is the collection of Ginans written by various medieval Pirs, most notably Pir Sadruddin and Pir Satgur Nur.

The Ismaili texts explain that before the formation of the misty stars which make up the galaxies, there was the frightful darkness of pre-eternity (dhandhukār), when the Incomprehensible One (God) was engrossed in contemplation. Before the universe came to be, he revealed his everlasting gnosis (amar ginān) to the True Guide. This is when the True Guide became the conductor of a Symphony of Gnosis and began his assembly to the Path of Truth (satpanth), by summoning all souls to salvation through ginān.

References

www.ismaili.net/Source/0723/07231a.html
Contractor, Narayaji Ramji. Pirana Satpanthni Pol Ane Satyano Prakash -First book revealing the insides of Pirana Satpanth to the outer world. 
Patel, CA Chandrakant Patel. Maa Uma no Aadesh Satpanth Chhodo - Recent significant developments in Pirana Satpanth community. https://archive.org/details/bk1018/
Esmail, Aziz.  A Scent of Sandalwood: Indo-Ismaili Religious Lyrics, London: Curzon in association with The Institute of Ismaili Studies, 2002, pp. xi + 227. August 2002
Khan, Dominique-Sila. Crossing the Threshold: Understanding Religious Identities in South Asia, London: I. B. Tauris in association with The Institute of Ismaili Studies, 2005, pp. 185. May 2005
Kassam, Tazim R. Songs of Wisdom and Circles of Dance: Hymns of the Satpanth Isma'ili Muslim Saint, Pir Shams
Wladimir Ivanow. Collectanea
Dr Navinchandra A Acharya, Religious Sects of Gujarat, Gujarat State University
Method of Pir Sadruddin's Mission of Converting Hindus to Muslims. http://www.ismaili.net/histoire/history07/history712.html
Khan, Dominique-Sila. Lived Islam in South Asia, Liminality and Legality: A Contemporary Debate among the Imamshahis of Gujarat, Social Science Press, 2004 pp209

External links
 Pir Imam Shah Bawa - http://pirimamshahbawa.org/about.html

Sufi orders
Nizari Ismailism
Medieval Hinduism
Religious syncretism in Asia